Harry Garnet Campbell (31 July 1903 – 21 January 1981) was an Australian rules footballer who played for and coached Essendon in the Victorian Football League (VFL).

Football
Campbell, noted for his strong disposal skills and pace, was best suited as either a centreman or winger. Essendon won Grand Finals in his first two seasons, but he was not a member of their premiership sides, finding it hard to break into the team initially. He was a regular from 1925 onwards and in the 1926 Brownlow Medal count finished as Essendon's highest vote getter and equal fifth overall. Campbell, who represented Victoria at the 1927 Melbourne Carnival, was appointed captain-coach of Essendon in 1931 but his stint and VFL career ended in 1933 when they finished with the wooden spoon. He finished his career as Sandringham's captain-coach.

See also
 1927 Melbourne Carnival

Footnotes

References
Holmesby, Russell and Main, Jim (2007). The Encyclopedia of AFL Footballers. 7th ed. Melbourne: Bas Publishing.

External links
 
 
 H.G. 'Garnet' Campbell, at The VFA Project.

1903 births
1981 deaths
Australian rules footballers from Melbourne
Essendon Football Club players
Essendon Football Club coaches
Yarraville Football Club players
Sandringham Football Club players
Sandringham Football Club coaches
People from Footscray, Victoria